, or Kammu, was the 50th emperor of Japan, according to the traditional order of succession. Kammu reigned from 781 to 806, and it was during his reign that the scope of the emperor's powers reached its peak.

Traditional narrative

He was the eldest son of Prince Shirakabe (later known as Emperor Kōnin), and was born prior to Shirakabe's ascension to the throne.

After his father became emperor, Kammu's half-brother, Prince Osabe was appointed to the rank of crown prince. His mother was Princess Inoe, a daughter of Emperor Shōmu; but instead of Osabe, it was Kammu who was later named to succeed their father. After Inoe and Prince Osabe were confined and then died in 775, Osabe's sister – Kammu's half-sister Princess Sakahito – became Kammu's wife. Later, when he ascended to the throne in 781, Kammu appointed his young brother, Prince Sawara, whose mother was Takano no Niigasa, as crown prince. Hikami no Kawatsugu, a son of Emperor Tenmu's grandson Prince Shioyaki and Shōmu's daughter Fuwa, attempted to carry out a coup d'état in 782, but it failed and Kawatsugu and his mother were sent into exile. In 785 Sawara was expelled and died in exile.

The Nara period saw the appointment of the first shōgun, Ōtomo no Otomaro by Emperor Kammu in 794 CE. The shōgun was the military dictator of Japan with near absolute power over territories via the military. Otomaro was declared "Sei-i Taishōgun" which means "Barbarian-subduing Great General". Emperor Kammu granted the second title of shōgun to Sakanoue no Tamuramaro for subduing the Emishi in northern Honshu.

Kammu had 16 empresses and consorts, and 32 imperial sons and daughters. Among them, three sons would eventually ascend to the imperial throne: Emperor Heizei, Emperor Saga and Emperor Junna. Some of his descendants (known as the Kammu Taira or Kammu Heishi) took the Taira hereditary clan title, and in later generations became prominent warriors. Examples include Taira no Masakado, Taira no Kiyomori, and (with a further surname expansion) the Hōjō clan. The waka poet Ariwara no Narihira was one of his grandsons.

Kammu is traditionally venerated at his tomb; the Imperial Household Agency designates , in Fushimi-ku, Kyoto, as the location of Kammu's mausoleum.

Events of Kammu's life
Kammu was an active emperor who attempted to consolidate government hierarchies and functions. Kammu appointed Sakanoue no Tamuramaro (758–811) to lead a military expedition against the Emishi.

 737: Kammu was born.
 773: Received the title of crown prince.
 April 30, 781(): In the 11th year of Kōnin's reign, he abdicated; and the succession was received by his son Kammu. Shortly thereafter, Emperor Kammu is said to have ascended to the throne. During his reign, the capital of Japan was moved from Nara (Heijō-kyō) to Nagaoka-kyō in 784. Shortly thereafter, the capital would be moved again in 794.
 July 28, 782: The sadaijin Fujiwara no Uona was involved in an incident that resulted in his removal from office and exile to Kyushi.  Claiming illness, Uona was permitted to return to the capital where he died; posthumously, the order of banishment was burned and his office restored. In the same general time frame, Fujiwara no Tamaro was named Udaijin.  During these days in which the offices of sadaijin and udaijin were vacant, the major counselors (the dainagon) and the emperor assumed responsibilities and powers which would have been otherwise delegated.
 783: The udaijin Tamaro died at the age of 62 years.
 783: Fujiwara no Korekimi became the new udaijin to replace the late Fujiwara no Tamaro.
 793: Under the leadership of Dengyō, construction began on the Enryaku Temple.
 794: The capital was relocated again, this time to Heian-kyō, where the palace was named .
 November 17, 794: The emperor traveled by carriage from Nara to the new capital of Heian-kyō in a grand procession. This marks the beginning of the Heian period.
 794 appointed Ōtomo no Otomaro as the first Shōgun "Sei-i Taishōgun—"Barbarian-subduing Great General", together with Sakanoue no Tamuramaro subdues the Emishi in Northern Honshu.
 806: Kammu died at the age of 70. Kammu's reign lasted for 25 years.

Eras of Kammu's reign
The years of Kammu's reign are more specifically identified by more than one era name (nengō).
 Ten'ō (781–82)
 Enryaku (782–806)

Politics

Earlier Imperial sponsorship of Buddhism, beginning with Prince Shōtoku (574–622), had led to a general politicization of the clergy, along with an increase in intrigue and corruption. In 784 Kammu shifted his capital from Nara to Nagaoka-kyō in a move that was said to be designed to edge the powerful Nara Buddhist establishments out of state politics—while the capital moved, the major Buddhist temples, and their officials, stayed put. Indeed, there was a steady stream of edicts issued from 771 right through the period of Kūkai's studies which, for instance, sought to limit the number of Buddhist priests, and the building of temples. However the move was to prove disastrous and was followed by a series of natural disasters including the flooding of half the city. In 785 the principal architect of the new capital, and royal favourite, Fujiwara no Tanetsugu, was assassinated.

Meanwhile, Kammu's armies were pushing back the boundaries of his empire. This led to an uprising, and in 789 a substantial defeat for Kammu's troops. Also in 789 there was a severe drought and famine—the streets of the capital were clogged with the sick, and people avoiding being drafted into the military, or into forced labour. Many disguised themselves as Buddhist priests for the same reason. Consequently, in 792 Kammu abolished national conscription, replacing it with a system wherein each province formed a militia from the local gentry. Then in 794 Kammu suddenly shifted the capital again, this time to Heian-kyō, which is modern day Kyoto. The new capital was started early the previous year, but the change was abrupt and led to even more confusion amongst the populace.

Politically Kammu shored up his rule by changing the syllabus of the university. Confucian ideology still provided the raison d'être for the Imperial government. In 784 Kammu authorised the teaching of a new course based on the Spring and Autumn Annals based on two newly imported commentaries: Kung-yang and Ku-liang. These commentaries used political rhetoric to promote a state in which the Emperor, as "Son of Heaven," should extend his sphere of influence to barbarous lands, thereby gladdening the people. In 798 the two commentaries became required reading at the government university.

Kammu also sponsored the travels of the monks Saichō and Kūkai to China, from where they returned to found the Japanese branches of, respectively, Tendai and Shingon Buddhism.

Kugyō
 is a collective term for the very few most powerful men attached to the court of the Emperor of Japan in pre-Meiji eras.

In general, this elite group included only three to four men at a time. These were hereditary courtiers whose experience and background would have brought them to the pinnacle of a life's career. During Kammu's reign, this apex of the Daijō-kan included:
 Sadaijin, Fujiwara no Uona (藤原魚名), 781–82.
 Sadaijin, Fujiwara no Tamaro (藤原田麿), 783.
 Udaijin, Ōnakatomi no Kiyomaro (大中臣清麿), 771–81
 Udaijin, Fujiwara no Tamaro (藤原田麿), 782–83.
 Udaijin, Fujiwara no Korekimi (藤原是公), 783–89.
 Udaijin, Fujiwara no Tsuginawa (藤原継縄), 790–96.
 Udaijin, Miwa ōkimi or Miwa oh (神王), 798–806
 Udaijin, Fujiwara no Uchimaro (藤原内麻呂) 756–812, 806–12.
 Dainagon

When the daughter of a chūnagon became the favored consort of the Crown Prince Ate (later known as Heizei-tennō), her father's power and position in court was affected. Kammu disapproved of Fujiwara no Kusuko, daughter of Fujiwara no Tanetsugu; and Kammu had her removed from his son's household.
 Chūnagon, Fujiwara no Tadanushi

Consorts and children

Emperor Kammu's Imperial family included 36 children.

Empress (Kōgō): Fujiwara no Otomuro (藤原乙牟漏), Fujiwara no Yoshitsugu’s daughter
First Son: Imperial Prince Ate (安殿親王) later Emperor Heizei
Fourth Son: Imperial Prince Kamino (賀美能親王/神野親王) later Emperor Saga
Imperial Princess Koshi (高志内親王; 789–809), married to Emperor Junna
Madame (Bunin later Kōtaigō): Fujiwara no Tabiko (藤原旅子), Fujiwara no Momokawa’s daughter
Fifth Son: Imperial Prince Ōtomo (大伴親王) later Emperor Junna
Consort (Hi): Imperial Princess Sakahito (酒人内親王), Emperor Kōnin’s daughter
First Daughter: Imperial Princess Asahara (朝原内親王; 779–817), 12th Saiō in Ise Grand Shrine (782–before 796), and married to Emperor Heizei
Madame (Bunin): Fujiwara no Yoshiko (藤原吉子; d.807), Fujiwara no Korekimi’s daughter
Second Son: Imperial Prince Iyo (伊予親王; 783–807)
Madame (Bunin) : Tajihi no Mamune (多治比真宗; 769–823), Tajihi no Nagano's daughter
Sixth Son: Imperial Prince Kazurahara (葛原親王; 786–853)
Ninth Son: Imperial Prince Sami (佐味親王; 793–825)
Tenth Son: Imperial Prince Kaya (賀陽親王; 794–871)
Imperial Prince Ōno (大野親王/大徳親王; 798–803)
Imperial Princess Inaba (因幡内親王; d.824)
Imperial Princess Anou (安濃内親王; d.841)
Madame (Bunin): Fujiwara no Oguso (藤原小屎), Fujiwara no Washitori's daughter
Third Son: Imperial Prince Manta (万多親王; 788–830)
Court Lady (Nyōgo) : Ki no Otoio (紀乙魚; d.840), Ki no Kotsuo's daughter
Court Lady (Nyōgo) : Kudarao no Kyōhō (百済王教法; d.840), Kudara no Shuntetsu's daughter
Court Lady (Nyōgo) : Tachibana no Miiko (橘御井子), daughter of Tachibana no Irii (橘入居)
Imperial Princess Sugawara (菅原内親王; d.825)
Sixteenth Daughter: Imperial Princess Kara (賀楽内親王; d.874)
Court Lady (Nyōgo) : Fujiwara no Nakako (藤原仲子), Fujiwara no Ieyori's daughter
Court Lady (Nyōgo) : Tachibana no Tsuneko (橘常子; 788–817), Tachibana no Shimadamaro's daughter
Ninth Daughter: Imperial Princess Ōyake (大宅内親王; d.849), married to Emperor Heizei
Court Lady (Nyōgo): Fujiwara no Shōshi (藤原正子), Fujiwara no Kiyonari's daughter
Court Lady (Nyōgo): Sakanoue no Matako (坂上全子, d.790), Sakanoue no Karitamaro's daughter
Twelfth Daughter: Imperial Princess Takatsu (高津内親王; d.841), married to Emperor Saga
Court Lady (Nyōgo): Sakanoue no Haruko (坂上春子, d.834), Sakanoue no Tamuramaro's daughter
Twelfth Son: Imperial Prince Fujii (葛井親王; 800–850)
Imperial Princess Kasuga (春日内親王; d.833)
Court Lady (Nyōgo): Fujiwara no Kawako (藤原河子, d.838), Fujiwara no Ōtsugu's daughter
Thirteenth Son: Imperial Prince Nakano (仲野親王; 792–867)
Thirteenth Princess: Imperial Princess Ate (安勅内親王; d.855)
Imperial Princess Ōi (大井内親王; d.865)
Imperial Princess Ki (紀内親王; 799–886)
Imperial Princess Yoshihara (善原内親王; d.863)
Court Lady (Nyōgo): Fujiwara no Azumako (藤原東子, d.816), Fujiwara no Tanetsugu's daughter
Imperial Princess Kannabi (甘南備内親王, 800–817), Married to Emperor Heizei
Court Lady (Nyōgo): Fujiwara no Heishi/Nanshi (藤原平子/南子, d.833), Fujiwara no Takatoshi's daughter
Eighth Daughter: Imperial Princess Ito (伊都内親王), married to Prince Abo
Court Lady (Nyōgo): Ki no Wakako (紀若子), Ki no Funamori's daughter
Seventh Son: Imperial Prince Asuka (明日香親王, d.834)
Court Lady (Nyōgo): Fujiwara no Kamiko (藤原上子), Fujiwara no Oguromaro's daughter
Imperial Princess Shigeno (滋野内親王, 809–857)
Court Lady (Nyōgo): Tachibana no Tamurako (橘田村子), Tachibana no Irii's daughter
Imperial Princess Ikenoe (池上内親王, d.868)
Court Lady (Nyōgo): Kawakami no Manu (河上好), Nishikibe no Haruhito's daughter
Imperial Prince Sakamoto (坂本親王, 793–818)
Court Lady (Nyōgo): Kudarao no Kyōnin (百済王教仁), Kudara no Bukyō's daughter
Imperial Prince Ōta (大田親王, d.808)
Court Lady (Nyōgo):  Kudarao no Jōkyō (百済王貞香), Kudara no Kyōtoku's daughter
Imperial Princess Suruga (駿河内親王, 801–820)
Court Lady (Nyōgo): Nakatomi no Toyoko (中臣豊子), Nakatomi no Ōio's daughter
Fifth Daughter: Imperial Princess Fuse (布勢内親王, d.812), 13th Saiō in Ise Shrine, 797–806
Court lady (Nyoju): Tajihi no Toyotsugu (多治比豊継), Tajihi no Hironari's daughter
Nagaoka no Okanari (長岡岡成, d.848), removed from the Imperial Family by receiving the family name from Emperor (Shisei Kōka, 賜姓降下) in 787
Court Lady (Nyoju):: Kudara no Yōkei (百済永継), Asukabe no Natomaro's daughter
Yoshimine no Yasuyo (良岑安世, 785–830), removed from the Imperial Family by receiving the family name from Emperor (Shisei Kōka, 賜姓降下) in 802

Ancestry

Legacy
In 2001, Japan's emperor Akihito told reporters "I, on my part, feel a certain kinship with Korea, given the fact that it is recorded in the Chronicles of Japan that the mother of Emperor Kammu was one of the descendant of King Muryong of Baekje." It was the first time that a Japanese emperor publicly referred to Korean blood in the imperial line. According to the Shoku Nihongi, Emperor Kammu's mother, Takano no Niigasa (720–90), is a descendant of Prince Junda, son of Muryeong, who died in Japan in 513 (Nihon Shoki, Chapter 17).

See also
 Emperor of Japan
 List of Emperors of Japan
 Heian-kyō
 Heian Shrine
 Kammu Seamount

Notes

References
 
 Ponsonby-Fane, Richard. (1959).  The Imperial House of Japan. Kyoto: Ponsonby Memorial Society. 
 Titsingh, Isaac. (1834).  Annales des empereurs du Japon (Nihon Ōdai Ichiran).  Paris: Royal Asiatic Society, Oriental Translation Fund of Great Britain and Ireland.  
 Varley, H. Paul. (1980).  Jinnō Shōtōki: A Chronicle of Gods and Sovereigns. New York: Columbia University Press. ;  

 
 

 
730s births
806 deaths
8th-century Japanese monarchs
9th-century Japanese monarchs
City founders
Japanese emperors
People of Heian-period Japan
People of Nara-period Japan
Buddhism in the Heian period
Buddhism in the Nara period
Japanese Buddhist monarchs